Leonid Novikov (born 10 January 1984) is a Russian orienteering competitor. He won a gold medal in the middle distance at the 2013 World Orienteering Championships. and a silver medal in the long distance at the 2017 world championships.

He was born in Belgorod and represents the club Spartak. Leonid is the younger brother of fellow orienteer Valentin Novikov.

References

External links

1984 births
Living people
Russian orienteers
Male orienteers
Foot orienteers
World Orienteering Championships medalists
People from Belgorod
Sportspeople from Belgorod Oblast